During the 1996–97 Italian football season, Vicenza competed in Serie A.

Summary 
In the summer of 1996 transferred in Vicenza the young forward Alessandro Iannuzzi, Giovanni Cornacchini who will be topscorer in Coppa Italia, Massimo Beghetto, teenager Pierre Wome discovered in Africa by technical director Sergio Vignoni also 18-yr-old Fabio Firmani. Out of the team, Joachim Bjorklund, Massimo Lombardini and Gabriele Grossi. In July 1996 the team started pre-season in Enego.

Vicenza had its best season for a long time, winning the Coppa Italia following a victory over Napoli in the final.

Squad 

 (captain)

 (vice-captain)

 (vice-vice-captain)

Transfers

Autumn-Winter

Competitions

Serie A

League table

Matches

Coppa Italia

Second round

Eightfinals

Quarterfinals

Semifinals

Final

Statistics

Squad

Position by round

Players statistics

References

External links 
 
 

L.R. Vicenza seasons
Vicenza Calcio